Kibigori is a small town in Kisumu County, Kenya. It is located 20 kilometres east of Kisumu. It is part of the Chemelil ward of Muhoroni Constituency and Nyando County Council.  Elevation 1242m.

Inhabitants
Kibigori being a cosmopolitan town is inhabited by many communities from Kenya such as the nandi, Luhya, Kisii among others, however the majority are the luos. The town is also home to Nubians who settled there as Kibigori was a settlement scheme. The communities engage in sugar cane plantation and small scale farming.

Transport 
It is served by a railway station on the national railway network, between the Stations of Miwani and Chemelil.

See also 
 Railway stations in Kenya

References 

Populated places in Nyanza Province
Kisumu County